Stara Zagora Air Base is a former Bulgarian military base that later became a regional, civil airport. It is located in central Bulgaria, southeast of Kazanluk and a few km south of Stara Zagora town. Its asphalt runway covers 2499 x 45 m.

History
The base is also known as Kolyu Ganchevo.  It opened in January 1940.

It used to house the 13th Attack Helicopters Air Regiment (flying 44 Mil Mi-24, of which 6 were of the "V" version and the remainder of the "D") of the 10th Combined Air Corps. As The corps transformed into Tactical Air Command, so did the regiment, becoming an air base. In 1994 it became the 23rd Attack Helicopter Air Base. The base closed in 2000, with all helicopters transferred to 24 Helicopter Base at Krumovo.

See also
List of Bulgarian Air Force bases
List of Bulgarian military bases
28th Air Detachment
Military of Bulgaria
The Bulgarian Cosmonauts
List of joint US-Bulgarian military bases

References

Air force installations of Bulgaria
Airports in Bulgaria
Stara Zagora